Klemenčič is a Slovene surname. Notable people with the surname include:

 Andrew Klemencic (born 1860), Slovene anarchist and union organizer
 Blaža Klemenčič (born 1980), Slovenian cyclist
 Ignacij Klemenčič (1853–1901), Slovenian physicist
 Janez Klemenčič (born 1971), Slovenian rower

See also
 Klemencice, a village in south-central Poland
 Klemen

Slovene-language surnames
Patronymic surnames